Tati can refer to:

Locations
 Tati River, Botswana
Tati Concessions Land, in present-day Botswana
Tati, Ranchi, a town in Jharkhand, India
 Tatí Yupí Refuge, a biological reserve in the district of Hernandarias, Alto Paraná Department, Paraguay

Music
 Tati (musical instrument), a stringed instrument used in traditional folk music by the Naga people in North Eastern India and north-western Myanmar
 Tati (album) a 2005 album by Italian trumpeter Enrico Rava
 Tati (song), a song by American rapper 6ix9ine and DJ SpinKing

Organisations

 TATI University College, a private university college in Malaysia
 Tati (company), a defunct French textile retail company

People
 Tati (queen), ancient Nubian queen of Egypt
Tati Esad Murad Kryeziu (1923–1993), heir presumptive to the throne of Albania prior to the birth of Prince Leka in 1939
 Tati Quebra-Barraco (born 1980), Brazilian rapper
Tati Rascón (born 1971), Spanish professional tennis player
 Jacques Tati (1907–1982), French film director and actor
 Jean-Baptiste Tati Loutard (1938–2009), Congolese politician and poet
Tati Westbrook, YouTube makeup artist
Sherri Ann "Tati" Jarvis, American murder victim

Other uses
 14621 Tati, a main-belt asteroid discovered in 1998
 Tati (film), a 1973 Brazilian film

See also
 Tati language (disambiguation)
 Tat (disambiguation)